Esther Anita Owen (1874–1932) was an American songwriter, best known for her 1894 song "Sweet Bunch of Daisies," which sold over one million copies. She published her first song at age 15 or 16, and became one of the most popular female songwriters of her generation, known especially for flower-themed songs. Owen was born in Brazil, Indiana, the daughter of a Welsh immigrant, and attended Saint Mary-of-the-Woods College.

References

External links

1874 births
1932 deaths
19th-century American composers
American women songwriters
Songwriters from Indiana
People from Brazil, Indiana
20th-century American composers
19th-century women composers
20th-century American women musicians
19th-century American women musicians
Saint Mary-of-the-Woods College alumni
20th-century women composers